Anatoma atlantica is a species of minute sea snail, a marine gastropod mollusk in the family Anatomidae.

Description
The shell of this species grows to a length of 2.1 mm.

Distribution
This species occurs off Eastern Florida.

References

 Bandel, K. 1998. Scissurellidae als Modell für die Variationsbreite einer natürlichen Einheit der Schlitzbandschnecken (Mollusca, Archaeogastropoda). Mitteilungen aus dem Geologisch-paläontogischen Institut der Universität Hamburg 81: 1–120, 23 pls.
 Geiger D.L. (2012) Monograph of the little slit shells. Volume 1. Introduction, Scissurellidae. pp. 1–728. Volume 2. Anatomidae, Larocheidae, Depressizonidae, Sutilizonidae, Temnocinclidae. pp. 729–1291. Santa Barbara Museum of Natural History Monographs Number 7.

External links

Anatomidae
Gastropods described in 1998